Saturday Night at the Movies is the fifth studio album released by English singer, Joe McElderry. The album features a collection of songs from films and musicals. The album was announced in May 2017 with McElderry saying; "My new album is a snapshot of where I am today and I am excited about the opportunity to share some of my favourite music with my fans. I hope people will join me as I continue on this musical journey!"

The album was released on 14 July 2017 by Decca Records.

McElderry promoted the album with a "Saturday Night at the Movies" national tour throughout July and August 2017, featuring Lloyd Daniels from the sixth series of The X Factor and Keith Jack and Ben James-Ellis from Any Dream Will Do.

Singles
"Gloria" was released on 17 March 2017.

Reception
Laura Klonowski from CelebMix gave the album a positive review commenting on Joe's "Sublime" vocals saying "During the songs Joe McElderry manages to put his own unique spin on them while still maintaining the classic feel."

Track listing

Charts

References

2017 albums
Covers albums
Joe McElderry albums